Billy Raffoul is a Canadian rock singer-songwriter from Leamington, Ontario, most noted as the winner of the 2021 SOCAN Songwriting Prize for his single "Western Skies".

The son of musician Jody Raffoul, he was introduced to the music business after accompanying his father on a session to perform on some Kid Rock demos in 2013, during which the producers invited him to perform some vocals after hearing his singing voice. He signed to Interscope Records in 2017, releasing several EPs and performing as a guest vocalist on Avicii's song "You Be Love", before releasing his full-length debut album International Hotel in 2020.

In 2023, he participated in an all-star recording of Serena Ryder's single "What I Wouldn't Do", which was released as a charity single to benefit Kids Help Phone's Feel Out Loud campaign for youth mental health.

Discography
1975 (2018)
Running Wild (2019)
A Few More Hours at YYZ (2020)
International Hotel (2020)
Olympus (2021) youtube release only

References

21st-century Canadian male musicians
Canadian rock singers
Canadian male singer-songwriters
People from Leamington, Ontario
Musicians from Ontario
Living people
Year of birth missing (living people)